Wawanaki (Aymara), also spelled Wawanaqui) is a mountain in the Cordillera Real in the Andes of Bolivia, about  high. It is located in the La Paz Department, Los Andes Province, Pucarani Municipality. Wawanaki is situated west of the main peak of the Kunturiri massif, northeast of Nasa Q'ara and east of Ch'iyar K'ark'a. It lies south of the lake Allqa Quta.

References 

Mountains of La Paz Department (Bolivia)